Muslim scholarship may refer to:

 Historical scholarship by Muslims:
Islamic Golden Age
Science in the medieval Islamic world
 Islamic religious sciences
 Islamic scholars or ulama

See also 

 List of contemporary Islamic scholars
 List of Muslim historians
 List of Muslim philosophers
 List of Islamic jurists
 List of Muslim scientists
 List of Muslim astronomers